Katey Red (born May 17, 1983) is a bounce artist and M.C. from New Orleans. Red is most known for being one of the first transgender rappers in bounce music and is credited with creating the sissy bounce genre.

Background 
Red was born in the Melpomene Projects. She attended Walter L. Cohen High School and was part of the school's marching band.

Career 
In 1998, DJ Jubilee saw Red rapping at a block party in New Orleans and signed her to his label, Take Fo' Records. She released her first album in 1999, titled "Melpomene Block Party".

Considered the first openly gay bounce artist, Red developed a unique style of bounce, which is often referred to as sissy bounce. Her style is high energy, often employing call and response. She frequently performs and collaborates with other bounce artists, including Big Freedia, Sissy Nobby, Vockah Redu, and Cheeky Blakk.

In 2011, Red, along with other New Orleans bounce artists, was the subject of an exhibition at the Ogden Museum of Southern Art entitled "Where They At?". The exhibition was also taken to the Abrons Art Center in New York City and the Birdhouse Gallery in Austin.

Red is also a drag artist and performs under the name Keltnny Galliano.

Discography

Studio albums 

 1999: Melpomene Block Party
 2000: Y2 Katey
 2013: Katey's Hits

Singles 

 1999: "Melpomene Block Party"
"The Punk Under Pressure"

Music videos 

 2011: "Where Da Melph At", directed by David S. White
2012: "Dreidel Song" by Gypsyphonic Disko, appears as featured artist
 2013: "Don't Speak (Make Ya Booty Go)", directed by David S. White

Collaborations 

 2000: It's a G Thang by K.C. Redd – performing "Tiddy Bop" with K.C. Redd
 2002: Choppa Style by Choppa – performing "Messy B***hes" with Choppa
 2010: Ya-Ka-May by Galactic – performing "Katey Vs Nobby" with Sissy Nobby, U.S. Billboard Chart No. 161
 2011: New Orleans Bounce Essentials, Vol. 2 – performing "That's My Juvie" with Magnolia Shorty
 2013: Son of Rogues Gallery: Pirate Ballads, Sea Songs & Chanteys – performing "Sally Racket" with Big Freedia and Akron / Family

Filmography

Awards 
In 2000, Red received the Best Emerging Rap/Hip-Hop Band or Performer at Offbeat magazine's Best of the Beat Awards.

Personal life 
Red married in 2017, her musical collaborator and friend Big Freedia was maid of honor.

References 

Living people
1983 births
Rappers from New Orleans
African-American rappers
LGBT African Americans
LGBT rappers
American LGBT musicians
LGBT people from Louisiana
Transgender women musicians
21st-century American rappers
African-American drag queens
Transgender drag performers
21st-century African-American musicians
20th-century African-American people
21st-century women rappers